Jr. Food Mart is a chain of convenience stores found throughout the southern United States.

History
In the 1960s, Jr. Food Mart was chartered as a subsidiary to the supermarket chain Jitney Jungle.

Today, the company is an independent company with many leased locations.

They operate convenience stores throughout Alabama, Mississippi and Louisiana.  At one time, they had franchise locations from Texas to Florida, and as far north as Ohio.

All the stores sell gasoline and groceries.  Many of them have fast service restaurants featuring, amongst others, the well-known Creole Fried Chicken.  The name and concept of spicy chicken was obtained from one of their franchisees, Sonny Adams.  While the chicken recipe that Mr. Adams had created was indeed, quite spicy, it was modified and adapted to be accepted in a wide variety of locations, and the resulting flavor, while still mildly spicy, was more like the flavor of Church's Fried Chicken.  This was in no small part because the Creole Fried Chicken concept was developed by Brian T. Reynolds and Shane Mitchell, whose experience in this concept came from that company.

In the late 1970s and early 1980s, most of their locations were in small towns at or near the primary intersections of the communities (commonly referred to as "Main and Main").   At that time, the company was led by Howard Blair, its President, and Russell Stutzman, the Executive Vice President.  Other notable members of the management team were Lee Crook, Director of Convenience Store Operations, and Shane Mitchell, Director of Food Service Operations.  The company experienced rapid growth during this period, due to the talent of Mr. Blair in locating and securing exceptional properties and favorable lease terms for its franchisees.  This combined with well-developed store designs and one of the most successful fast-food concepts of its time, made Jr. Food Mart one of the innovators of the convenience store industry during that time period.  The current model of convenience store/fast food hybrids that include Mc Donald's, Taco Bell, and others into convenience store locations, can well be traced back to the successful implementation of Creole Fried Chicken into the Jr. Food Mart store designs.

This chain is not related to a different chain called Jr. Food Stores that operates in south central Kentucky and northern middle Tennessee.

References

External links

Rankin County, Mississippi
Companies based in Mississippi
Economy of the Southeastern United States
Convenience stores of the United States